Eilona (Elona) Ariel (Hebrew: אילונה אריאל; born 1958) is a documentary filmmaker.

Early life

Ariel was born in 1958 in Israel as Eilona Frenkel.

Career
In 1978 she moved to New York City and spent nine years studying and working as a musician and a photographer.

In 1980 she received a diploma from the Germain School of Photography in New York City. From 1983 to 1984 she was the Managing Director of the International Production Manual - The Producer’s Masterguide.

Between the years of 1987 and 1995 she lived and worked in Asia.

In 1995, Ms. Ariel returned to Israel where she established the production company Karuna Films Ltd., together with Ayelet Menahemi. Since then she has produced and co-directed several documentaries, among them the award winning Doing Time, Doing Vipassana (1997), which made a great impact on prison systems all over the world, and won the Pass Award of The National Council on Crime and Delinquency (USA). In 2005, Doing Time, Doing Vipassana was re-released for screenings all over the USA. Ms. Ariel’s film, It’s About Time won the Best Documentary and Best Script prizes at the Jerusalem International Film Festival, the 2002 Japan Prize for Best Documentary, and participated in INPUT 2002, IDFA, and the Toronto International Film Festival.

Her films have been broadcast on PBS, NBC, ABC, MSNBC, the National Geographic Channel, and the Discovery Channel.

Between 2012 -2013 she worked as the COO of Hostr, a web platform that curated talent for live performances in home venues.
From 2014 until 2019 Eilona Ariel was working at The Yuval Noah Harari International Office, managing his Film/TV dept. Eilona is executive producing the adaptation of Prof. Harari’s best seller book SAPiENS, to be produced by Ridley Scott and directed by Oscar Winner, Asif Kapadia. 

Since 2019 she is working on various projects with multidisciplinary artists.

Filmography
 Doing Time, Doing Vipassana; written and directed by Eilona Ariel and Ayelet Menahemi
Israel, 1997, 70 Minutes, Color, Hebrew, English Subtitles
 It's About Time; by Ayelet Menahemi and Eilona Ariel
Israel, 2001, 54 Minutes, Color, Hebrew, English Subtitles
 The Compass
 Pilgrimage to the Sacred Land
 Global Pagoda
 Beyond the Gardens (a film about Baron de Rothschild)

It's About Time

Awards

 NHK JAPAN PRIZE
INTERNATIONAL EDUCATIONAL PROGRAM  CONTEST - 2002
Grand Prix and the Governor of Tokyo Prize for Best Documentary

 JERUSALEM INTERNATIONAL FILM FESTIVAL - July 2001
Wonlgin Prize for Best Documentary
Lipper Prize for Best Script

Festivals

 Jerusalem Intl. Film Festival - July 2001
 Toronto International Film Festival (TIFF) - September 2001 
 Amsterdam International Documentary Film Festival (IDFA) - November 2001
 Goteborg Film Festival (Sweden) - January 2002
 Venice International Television Festival - March 2002
 Philadelphia Jewish Film Festival - March 2002
 Wisconsin Film Festival - April 2002
 Mediawave Film Festival, Hungary - April 2002
 Israel Film Festival, U.S.A - April–June 2002
 Stockholm Jewish Film Festival - May 2002
 INPUT 2002, Rotterdam - May 2002
 Kalamata International Documentary Film Festival - Greece - October 2002
 Docupolis, Barcelona - October 2002
 JAPAN PRIZE contest, Tokyo - November 2002
 Boston Jewish Film Festival - November 2002
 Washington Jewish Film Festival - December 2002
 Palm Beach Jewish Film Festival - December 2002
 Tucson Jewish Film Festival - January 2003
 ISRATIM - Paris Israeli Film Festival - January 2003
 Allentown Jewish Film Festival - March 2003
 Minneapolis Festival of Jewish Film - March 2003
 THE PROMISE - THE LAND festival, Linz, Austria - April 2003
 New Jersey Jewish Film Festival - April 2003
 Vancouver Jewish Film Festival - May 2003

TV/Cable
 Channel 8 - Israel, September 2001
 YLE TV - Finland, October 2002
 NHK-Japan, November 2002
 SIC - Portugal, October 2002
 CUNY-TV - New York, USA, Fall 2003
 Continental Airlines - October 2002

Doing Time, Doing Vipassana

Awards
 Golden Spire - San Francisco International Film Festival, 1998
 Silver Plaque - INTERCOM, Chicago 1998
 NCCD Pass Award - The National Council On Crime And Delinquency, USA 1998
 Finalist Award - New York Film Festivals, 1998
 Silver Winner Award - Crested Butte Reel Festival, Colorado, USA 2000
 Gold Illumination Award - Crested Butte Reel Festival, Colorado, USA 2000

Television Screenings 
 PBS - USA 1998
 NHK - Japan 
 INFINITY - Mexico, Argentina, Peru, Brazil, Venezuela, Panama
 YLE - Finland
 Channel 8 - Israel 
 TV Poland 
 TSI - Switzerland 
 DR TV - Denmark 
 RTÉ - Ireland 
 ITN - Sri Lanka 
 Seattle Public TV - U.S.A.2000
 World Link TV - U.S.A. 
 The Dish Network - U.S.A. 
 Channel 11 - Thailand
 SHAW TV CALGARY - U.S.A. 2002  
 Multicultural Channel 78 - U.S.A. 2002 
 Shaw TV Edmonton - U.S.A. 2002

Festivals
 DocuNoga Film Festival - Israel 1997
 San Francisco International Film Festival - USA, 1998
 New York International Film Festival - USA, 1998
 Santa Barbara International Film Festival - USA, 1998
 Intercom - Chicago, Illinois 1998
 Taiwan International Documentary Film Festival - Taiwan, 1998
 Media Wave - Hungary, 1999
 Ethno Film Festival - Berlin, Germany 1999
 Bombay International Film Festival - Bombay, India, 1999
 Portland Women Directors Film Festival - Oregon, U.S.A.1999
 Crested Butte Reel Festival - Colorado, U.S.A 2000
 Unesco 2nd Festival of Women Creators Of the Two Seas - Greece, 2000
 Buddhism in Film (Caligari FilmBuhne) - Wiesbaden, Germany 1999
 Women in Buddhism - Cologne, Germany 2000
 Buddhist Film Festival - Wien, Austria, 2000
 Parabola Film & Video Festival - New York, U.S.A., 2000
 Human Rights Nights Film Festivals - Bologna, Italy, 27–30 March 2003
 Buddhist Film Festival - Ulan Batar, Mongolia, 2004

Theatrical Screenings
 Cinema Village - New York City 
 The Loft Cinema - Tucson, Arizona
 AZ Reel Art Ways Cinema - Hartford, Connecticut
 Roxie Cinema - San Francisco, California
 The MAC - Dallas, Texas
 Cinematheque - Tel-Aviv, Israel
 Bijou Theatre - Eugene, Oregon
 Lumiere cinema - Göttingen, Germany

References

External links
Hostr
Karuna Films
It's About Time

Pilgrimage to the Sacred land

Israeli documentary filmmakers
1958 births
Living people
Artists from New York City